The 2002 Harlow District Council election took place on 2 May 2002 to elect members of  Harlow District Council in Essex, England. The whole council was up for election with boundary changes since the last election in 2000 reducing the number of seats by 9. The Labour party lost overall control of the council to no overall control.

Background
Before the election Labour controlled the council with 25 councillors, compared to 8 each for the Conservatives and Liberal Democrats, while there was 1 independent councillor. Boundary changes took effect for the 2002 election, reducing the number of councillors from 42 to 33 and the number of wards from 16 to 11 and meaning that the whole council was to be elected.

11 Labour and 1 Conservative councillors stood down at the election, including the Labour assistant leader Derek Fenny and a former council chairman Terry Abel.

Election result
Labour were reduced by 16 seats and thereby lost overall control of the council. Overall turnout at the election was 36.84%.

Following the election the Conservative and Liberal Democrat leaders, Andrew Johnson and Lorna Spenceley, made an agreement to be joint leaders of the council.

Ward results

Bush Fair (3 seats)

Church Langley (3 seats)

Great Parndon (3 seats)

Harlow Common (3 seats)

Little Parndon and Hare Street (3 seats)

Mark Hall (3 seats)

Netteswell (3 seats)

Old Harlow (3 seats)

Staple Tye (3 seats)

Sumners and Kingsmoor (3 seats)

Toddbrook (3 seats)

References

2002
2002 English local elections
2000s in Essex